Operation Ngatipedzenavo, was a large scale Zimbabwean government assassination plot intended to eliminate the MDC leadership and punish those who supposedly voted for the Movement for Democratic Change in the 2008 presidential election rather than for ZANU-PF.

However, the campaign met with harsh condemnation from Zimbabwean opposition parties, church groups, non-governmental organizations, and the wider international community. Also people were beaten thoroughly, forced to sit on hot plate stoves, cut fingers, cut arms and skinned alive that intimidated individuals.

Perpetrators 
There has been much documentation of those who have carried out the assaults, beatings and murders on Zimbabwean citizens. These include Modesta Mushambi, Kenneth Dzemba, Cephas Chikomo, Itai Kandemire.

See also
 Operation Dzikisai Madhishi
 Operation Mavhoterapapi

References

2008 in Zimbabwe
History of Zimbabwe
Law enforcement in Zimbabwe
Political repression in Zimbabwe
Politics of Zimbabwe
2008 Zimbabwean general election
Society of Zimbabwe